Jules Vallès (11 June 1832 – 14 February 1885) was a French journalist, author, and left-wing political activist.

Early life
Vallès was born in Le Puy-en-Velay, Haute-Loire. His father was a supervisor of studies (pion), later a teacher, and unfaithful to Jules' mother. Jules was a brilliant student. The Revolution of 1848 in France found him participating in protests in Nantes where his father had been assigned to teach. It was during this period that he began to align himself with the budding socialist movement. After being sent to Paris to prepare for his entrance into Lycée Condorcet (1850) he neglected his studies altogether. He took part in the uprising against Napoleon III during the French coup of 1851, fighting together with his friend Arthur Ranc at one of the rare barricades on December 2. Vallès later fled to Nantes, where his father had him committed to a mental institution.(ref 1978, Bernard Noël e.a.) Thanks to help from his friend Antoine Arnould, he managed to escape a few months later. He returned to Paris, where he joined the staff of Le Figaro, and became a regular contributor to the other leading journals.

In 1853 he was arrested for conspiring against Napoleon III,  but was later freed due to a lack of evidence. He lived in poverty, writing journalism for bread (the stock market page of the Figaro even, until fired for his bias against capitalism). It was under these conditions that he wrote his first book L'Argent (1857). Les Amours de Paille (1859), a comedy written in collaboration with Poupart-Davyl, was a failure.(ref 1990 Alain Viala) At the insistence of his colleague Henri Rochefort he found an administrative job issuing birth certificates for the Vaugirard town hall.(1860) He became a steady friend of Hector Malot and  began to live with his lover, Joséphine Lapointe. He decided to become a pion himself in Caen, but was quickly discharged. Back in Paris, his friend Hector Malot helped him reacquire his job at the town hall. In 1864–1865 he wrote literary criticism for Progrès de Lyon. In 1865 he collected much of his newspaper work in a book Les Refractaires that sold well. A second collection in 1866 La Rue had less success. In 1867 he started the newspaper La Rue, which was later suppressed by the government after a mere eight months of publication.

Republican opposition

By this time he was a recognized leader of the republican opposition against the Second French Empire. In 1865 he had lost his job at Vaugirard for a speech he gave against the capitalist society of the Second Empire, eluding the censorship by advertising a talk on Balzac. In 1868 he was twice convicted for press crimes: one month in prison for criticizing  the police, two months for criticising  the Empire. At the elections of 1869 he was the candidate to the left opposing the moderate Jules Simon.
He lost the election and went to work for La Marseillaise the newspaper of Henri Rochefort, meanwhile contributing to La Liberté of Émile de Girardin.

In the summer of 1869 members of several "Chambres syndicales" of Paris workers rented a space at nr 6, Place de la Corderie to hold the meetings of the "Chambre fédérale des Sociétés ouvrières", the "Conseil fédéral des sections parisiennes de l'Internationale", and as the events unfolded the "Comité central républicain des Vingt Arrondissements" (1870) and the "Comité central de la Garde nationale". (March 1871) It was to be the very organisational center of the Paris Commune. Its activities are prominently described in  Jacques Vingtras:L'Insurgé. Jules Vallès had friends and connections among all the tendencies represented: Proudhon, Blanquist, Marxist and while he was himself independent of all of them he represented the active force of each. He was well known and well liked and when in 1870 the Government of National Defence spread the rumour that the candidates of the extreme left including Vallès had been on the payroll of the Imperial police at the 1869 elections, the Corderie gave him a vote of confidence.

1870

The year leading up to the Paris Commune began with the assassination of Victor Noir (January 10). Jules Vallès and Henri Rochefort found themselves at the head of the mass manifestation at Victor Noir's funeral (January 12); Rochefort interceding with the blanquist Gustave Flourens who wanted to begin the anti-imperial insurrection there and then.

In July Napoleon III embroiled France in the Franco-Prussian War. Vallès was among the very few anti-war protesters, and was jailed as a consequence (August 6). On September 2 Napoleon III capitulated at Sedan and was captured. On September 4 the Third French Republic was proclaimed and the Government of National Defence installed.(Gambetta) Vallès was freed from prison and took part in the popular manifestations leading to the formation of the "Comité central républicain des Vingt arrondissements" of which he -like many other leaders of the Paris Commune- became a prominent member; heading even, for a while, a battalion of the "Garde nationale". On September 18 the Prussians laid siege on a Paris unwilling to accept defeat and calling for all out war by the provinces. On October 5, Flourens marched the five battalions "Garde nationale" of Belleville in disciplined military fashion to the Hôtel de Ville to show preparedness. On October 31, a first blanquist uprising erupted at Belleville with Vallès in command of his battalion occupying the town hall of la Vilette. The uprising failed and Vallés had to go in hiding.

1871 and the Paris Commune

At the start of 1871 Jules Vallès at the initiative of the "Comité central républicain des Vingt arrondissements" edited the "Affiche Rouge" posted on January 7 : the first call for the proclamation of the Paris Commune. On Mars 11, Vallès was judged for his participation in the October plot. He escaped from the tribunal after hearing himself condemned to six months in prison, and his Le Cri du Peuple which he had started on February 22, banned from further appearance. On March 18, the Commune was officially proclaimed; March 21, Le Cri du Peuple reappeared to become one of the most successful newspapers of the Commune - together with Père Duchêne. On March 26 he was elected by the 15th district (Vaugirard: 4,403 votes of 6,467 voters) to the Conseil de la Commune; nominated to the commission of Public Education (March 29).

Although quick to the march when it came to demand individual liberties Jules Vallès was also a voice for opposite opinion: he claimed his reserve when the separation of Church and State was proclaimed (April 2), opposed the suppression of the "reactionary" newspapers (April 26), he voted against the institution of the Comité de Salut with its jacobin tendencies, and together with 22 other prominent members - among them his old friend Arnould, the painter Gustave Courbet, Vermorel, Varlin...he signed  the manifest of the minority which he published in his newspaper. (May 15)

On May 21 the Versailles troops entered Paris through the porte Saint-Cloud while Vallès, among minority members reintegrated in the Commune, presided over its last session - in judgement over Cluseret and his failure to hold the fort of Issy (and with Vallès in sympathy with the defendant). During the Semaine Sanglante (May 21 – May 28) he took part in the fighting, making a last stand in the rue de Paris (now rue de Belleville) on May 28 with his steadfast friend Gabriel Ranvier. Together they managed to escape the fusillades and went into exile. In 1872 both were given death sentences in absentia.

Le Cri du Peuple
Jules Vallès' newspaper Le Cri du Peuple -Journal politique quotidien, 10 centimes was among the most successful of the Paris Commune. Only Journal Officiel, La Commune, Le Mot d'Ordre, le Père Duchêne and le Vengeur appear to have been contending rivals. Its style has been described as "simple firmity, sympathetic authority, reflected realism due to a conviction rendered spontaneously lyrical by its sincerity" by Bernard Noël, who read through the entire press produced in Paris 1871 for his Dictionnaire de la Commune (1978).

After the paper was banned by General Vinoy (1871) on March 11 (nr18), it was reissued on March 21 (nr19) and was published without interruption until Tuesday May 23 (nr83).

Its collaborators were: Casimir Bouis, Jean-Baptiste Clément, Pierre Denis, and Charles Rochat, with occasional articles by Henry Bauer (1851–1915), Courbet, and André Leo.

Because of the communal tasks taken up by most other editors, the work of chief editor in practice fell to Pierre Denis, who set the tone with accent on the Proudhonian ideology. He represented his views in the First International, of which he was a member: recognition of individual liberties, suppression of the permanent army and police, "Laïcité" and free education, entire benefit of work produced, autonomy of the commune -or Voluntary association, autonomy, federation, and union.

Jacques Vingtras and exile
The foregoing events were all chronicled in the three parts of Jules Vallès major work: Jacques Vingtras: L'Enfant, Le Bachelier, L'insurgé. Vallès wrote Jacques Vingtras during his bitter exile following the Paris Commune.

Vallès went to live in exile in London. In 1875 Vallès, in the absence of his companion Joséphine Lapointe, had an affair with another woman.  She bore his daughter, but when the girl died at 10 months, Vallès quickly separated from the mother. This period in 1876 marked his complete destitution. His friend Hector Malot negotiated the publication of his novel Jacques Vingtras - L'Enfant as a serial (feuilleton) in the newspaper Le Siècle (June–August 1878). The extreme realism combined with corrosive irony resulted in a negative public reaction and dropping of the project. In January–May 1879 Le Bachelier appeared in La Révolution française under the title Les Mémoires d'un révolté. The first book Jacques Vingtras - L'Enfant, Le Bachelier was published by Charpentier and signed 'Jean La Rue' (Vallès had tried to start the paper La Rue in Brussels that same year - a failure).

In 1879–1880 he came to know Séverine, whose friendship secured the final draft of L'Insurgé. She persuaded Charpentier to publish the book in 1886, after Vallès's death.

Among the French authors most influenced by the racy, concise and ironic style of Jules Vallès is Jules Renard, author of the child's  portrait Poil de Carotte. Séverine at least recognised the quality of the prose of her friend in his writings (see: Jules Renard Journal 1897-1910).

Amnesty and last days
After his liberation on 11 June 1879, Blanqui had managed to get support from Gambetta for the plight of the many thousand destitutes who had been implicated in the Paris Commune. On 11 July 1880 the government issued a general pardon, in the wake of which Vallès was able to return to Paris. There he renewed his journalism with vigour. In 1881 he was among the 100,000 mourners in procession for Blanqui's funeral.

In 1883 he was entirely successful in restarting Le Cri du Peuple as a voice for libertarian and socialist ideas. At the same time he became increasingly ill with diabetes. During a health crisis in November 1884, he was taken to the house of doctor Guebhard and his secretary Séverine. He assigned Hector Malot to be the executor of his will and died on 14 February 1885.

His funeral was also a major public event, attracting a procession of some 60,000 following the coffin to Père Lachaise Cemetery.

Notes

References
 Alain Viala: Préface et commentaires à Jules Vallès "Jacques Vingtras - L'Enfant" Paris: Presses Pocket, 1990
 Marie-Claire Bancqaert: Préface et notes à Vallès "L'Insurgé" Paris: Collection Folio/Gallimard, 1979
 Bernard Noël: "Dictionnaire de la Commune" Paris: Champs/Flammarion, 1978

External links

 
  
 Vallès in Le Cri du Peuple (English)
 1867 Caricature of Jules Vallès by André Gill
 The Child by Jules Vallés new edition from New York Review Books
  Jacques Vingtras trilogy, audio version 

1832 births
1885 deaths
People from Le Puy-en-Velay
French anarchists
French socialists
French newspaper founders
Communards
Burials at Père Lachaise Cemetery
Members of the International Workingmen's Association
19th-century French journalists
French male journalists
19th-century French novelists
French male novelists
19th-century French businesspeople
19th-century male writers